The Vyshnivets Palace or the Wiśniowiecki Palace is located in the urban-type settlement of Vyshnivets (near the city of Zbarazh) in Ternopil Oblast of western Ukraine. Historically, it was the main seat of the Wiśniowiecki princely family which takes its name from this castle.

History
In 1395 landlord Dmitry Koribut having been removed from power in Novgorod-Siversky attained instead great dominion of Volyn' lands, where under his leadership fortress construction began. This is how on the banks of Horin' River in the town of Vyshnivets', Old Vyshnivets' today, first castle came about.

Upon Dmitry Koribut's death due to absence a successor of male gender, castle of Vyshnivets' all together with the estate passes through Olgerdovich-Nesvitsky sidelong lineage of three generations till Michał Zbaraski Wiśniowiecki gaining power (1517).

Following immediate raid of Turk-Tatar forces in 1491 razed the fort post in the town of Stary Vishnivets and settlement that had been secured by it. In a result the same year landlord Michał Zbaraski, having taken a different name of Wiśniowiecki, broke the ground for another fort-post up the stream on the crest of round hill, and new fastness destined to be a bulwark and vindicator for new generations from Tatar-Turkish inroads for centuries to come.

Latest architectural view as a defense fortification the stronghold took having been completely reconstructed in 1640s, when Jeremi Wiśniowiecki supervised the work. The features of defensive bastion system was taken upon at that time, although it hadn't done much saving the castle from Cossacks' capturing during uprising of 1648 and being sacked by Tatars a year later following signing of Treaty of Zboriv.

Despite the use of the most advanced martial fortification technique, Vyishnivets surrendered to enemy inroads: formerly in 1655 to the swords of Tatar, then more recently twenty years later in 1675 during the Second Polish-Ottoman War to Turks turning into a ruin. In the course of the tumultuous 17th century, the town and the castle stood destroyed as the king of Poland, John III Sobieski, relieved the city from its taxation burden for twenty years.

Michał Serwacy Wiśniowiecki (1680–1744), last descendant of Wiśniowiecki family by father's line, a wealthy Polish nobleman, broached revival of patrimonial estate. He raised not a castle, but a magnificent accomplished palace atop of extinguished cinders completing it in 1720. Nonetheless it did retain a role of combat structure. Garrison was dislocated there until 1760. Somewhat later on appeared indefeasible attributes of magnate wealth of a castle church and grand park.

The death of last male member of Wiśniowiecki family caused palace and estate in the city of Vyshnivets ownership being transferred by female line to Mniszech family under their care and supervision of whom castle had revealed all of its beauty adding another facet to the palettes of European palace and park recreation art.

For three generations Mniszechs owners (Jan Karol (1716–1759), Michał Jerzy (1748–1806), and Karol Filip (1794–1846)) rendered the estate true royal charm: painting collection of Wiśniowieccy, Potoccy, Sanguszkowie, Czartoryscy as well as Ostrogscy's, sculptures, retro furniture, Holland tile mantles, literature, weapon, cutlery and china. All-round upgrade in the same time had only given final accord to the appearance of Volyn' nicest palace residence.

No sooner remaining owner of Mnisheks four years later having succeeded into patrimonial rights as he had to leave to France bringing along most valuable family relics which was two thousands books, family portraits, letters, heraldry researches. In the same time Vyshnivets palace for many years became a place of bargaining trade off where many previously thoughtfully and mindfully collected items were sold out, all that a laymen would be happy to pay cash for.

For more than sixty years (1852–1913) castle changed nine owners, that despite their titles and social status used one of the most lavish European palaces as the mean to accrue their perpetually depleting banking accounts. Palace lost its glamour, and priceless collection was sacked.

During the time before First World War an attempt made by yet another owner, Volyn' aristocrat and nobleman Demidov, Pavel Oleksandrovich (1869–1935), and Kyiv architect, Władysław Horodecki (1863–1930) was invited to join the cause. Unfortunately, war and revolution introduced its own adjustments: 25th Russian Army Corps utilized facilities followed by ministry of transitional government and Petlura lieutenants.

In the mid-1920s, the main building of Vyshnivets Palace accommodated a museum collection, while the remaining space was utilized as a school of craftsmanship.

Second World War became a venue and an argumentation for most recent forgoers shipping remains of the valuables to Moscow (1940–1941), and German Armed Forces used it as a police precinct and Gestapo (1941–1944) depriving architectural structure from those few showpieces still being there. Fire on the premises (1944) completed started ruination.

Post-war restoration of 1950th practically all together renewed outer appearance of the palace with only few back draws needed to be mentioned as inside facility remodeling performed, outside park area hadn't been worked on, palace yard grew with self-disseminated weeds, and plundering by local residents had taken place.

Only in 1963 Vyshnivets Palace recognized by authorities as monument of architectural art, although it still was being utilized for various business transactions and occupied as a club, a library, an apparel factory, and a school of craftsmanship.

Having Ukrainian Independence established reflecting soundly on its fortune: in 1993 there was historical and cultural researches conducted, castle officially became a branch of State Historic Architectural Sanctuary in the city of Zbarazh (1999). Later on it was included into the registry of National Sanctuary of Ternopil' Castle (2005), program of restoration and intended usage (2005–2011) started, all none-associated business entities left the premises (2007).

On the year of 2014 main scope of construction work, inside restoration, park area, and fencing completed.

Architecture

Architecture of Vyshnivets Palace combines features of Late Baroque and Classicism. Having reconstruction completed, spacious palace took on classic appearance: elongated in prospective two story facade with its flanks being one level taller poses symmetrical architectural composition forming one side voiding rectangle. Central part of the facade containing ceremonial avant-corps decorated entry way has a triangular shield with a palatial ornamentation on it. The rear side of facade in between avant-corps has arch galleries. Gateway to the residence is accomplished majestically resembling antic triumphant entry. 

Inside the palace, the framework is symmetrical with a hallway, stairways, and saloon. A few halls in the porter combined with wide arch crossings that house numerous pieces of art mirror gallery being once most known in-between dignified Polish–Lithuanian Commonwealth residences of the 18th century.

Gallery

References

External links
 
 

Castles in Ukraine
Buildings and structures in Ternopil Oblast
Tourist attractions in Ternopil Oblast
Museums in Ternopil Oblast
History museums in Ukraine
Art museums and galleries in Ukraine
Wiśniowiecki family residences